HMS Falmouth was a 50-gun fourth rate ship of the line built for Royal Navy in the 1690s. The ship participated in several battles during the Nine Years' War of 1688–97 and the War of the Spanish Succession (1701–1715), including the action of August 1702. She was captured by the French in 1704.

Description
The ship's tonnage was 610  tons burthen. Records of Falmouths original armament have not survived, but one of her sister ships was armed with 21 culverins, 18 eight-pounder cannon and 10 minions while another had 22 twelve-pounder guns, 22 six-pounder guns and 6 minions in 1696. In 1703, her armament consisted of 22 twelve-pounder guns on the lower gundeck and 22 six-pounder guns on the upper deck. On the quarterdeck were 8 six-pounder guns with another pair on the forecastle. The ship had a crew of 160–230 officers and ratings.

Construction and career
Falmouth was the second ship in the Royal Navy to be named after the eponymous port. The ship was ordered on 1 January 1693 and contracted out to Edward Snelgrove in Limehouse. She was launched on 25 June 1693 and commissioned that same year.

The ship took part in the action of August 1702 and on the fourth and fifth days of the battle supported Admiral John Benbow's attacks when other members of the squadron failed to do so. On 4 August 1704 she was attacked by two French privateers. There was a vigorous exchange of fire during which Falmouths captain, Thomas Kenney, was killed. Falmouth was then surrendered to the French.

See also
List of ships captured in the 18th century

Notes

References
 
 
 Lavery, Brian (2003) The Ship of the Line - Volume 1: The Development of the Battlefleet 1650–1850. Conway Maritime Press. .
 
 Winfield, Rif (2009) British Warships in the Age of Sail 1603–1714: Design, Construction, Careers and Fates. Barnsley, UK: Seaforth Publishing. .

Ships of the line of the Royal Navy
1690s ships